Park Ki-Jung (born May 13, 1970) is a South Korean sprint canoer who competed in the early 1990s. At the 1992 Summer Olympics in Barcelona, he was eliminated in the repechages of both the K-1 1000 m and the K-2 500 m events, and did not finish in the heats of the K-2 1000 m event.

External links
Sports-Reference.com profile

1970 births
Canoeists at the 1992 Summer Olympics
Living people
Olympic canoeists of South Korea
South Korean male canoeists
Asian Games medalists in canoeing
Canoeists at the 1990 Asian Games
Canoeists at the 1994 Asian Games
Medalists at the 1990 Asian Games
Asian Games silver medalists for South Korea
Asian Games bronze medalists for South Korea